Cossano may refer to:

 Cossano Belbo, municipality in the Province of Cuneo in the Italian region Piedmont
 Cossano Canavese, municipality in the Metropolitan City of Turin in the Italian region Piedmont